Sara Susana del Valle Trimarco de Veron, or Susana Trimarco (born 1954), is an Argentinian human rights activist, whose efforts to combat human trafficking and corruption have been recognized internationally. After the 2002 disappearance of her daughter, who is believed to have been kidnapped by a human trafficking network, she spent years searching for her daughter, and started a foundation to support victims of sex trafficking. Her lobbying is credited as bringing corruption and government impunity to the fore in Argentina, a discussion which led to a 2011 law banning the advertisement of sexual services in newspapers and magazines.

Life 

Susana Trimarco's daughter Marita (born María de los Ángeles) was kidnapped in San Miguel de Tucumán, the capital of Tucumán Province, on April 3, 2002. Marita was the mother of a two-year-old girl and had gone to a doctor appointment when, according to a witness, she was pulled into a red car. It is believed that she was forced into prostitution.

Trying to find her, Trimarco began to visit brothels dressed as a prostitute. She received threats and was given false clues in order to mislead her search. Her investigations led to the release of other women supposedly deprived of their liberty, but her daughter is still missing.

In 2007, Trimarco founded the Fundación María de los Ángeles ("María of the Angels Foundation") in order to rescue kidnapped girls in Argentina. It claims to have achieved the release of hundreds.

In February and March 2012, Trimarco testified at the trial of 13 people, including police officers, who were accused of kidnapping Marita Veron and selling her to human traffickers. All the defendants were acquitted on December 12, 2012.

In December 2012, seven men and six women were charged with Marita's kidnapping, but acquitted in a Tucuman criminal court. A week later, Trimarco met with Argentina's president, and impeachment proceedings were started against the 3 judges who had delivered the verdict. In December 2013, ten of the original 13 defendants were convicted of the kidnapping and sexual exploitation of Marita Verón.

Legacy and awards

Legislation

Trimarco's campaign has exposed the sex-trafficking industry and brought the issues of corruption of high officials and the impunity of the human trafficking networks into the public eye. As a result of her efforts, Argentina passed a law that makes the abduction and sexual exploitation of persons a federal offense in 2007. The law also established a Rescue Office to provide legal assistance to victims.

In 2008, Trimarco's efforts led to Argentine legislation that prohibited human trafficking, and led to 3,000 people being rescued from human traffickers in Argentina. In 2011, President Cristina Fernández de Kirchner enacted "Rubro 59", which bans the advertisement of sexual services in newspapers and magazines. For the first time, the Ministry of Security was able to uncover that police forces were implicated in trafficking rings.

In 2008 an anti-trafficking law was passed, and a Rescue Office was established in the Ministry of Justice and Human Rights to oversee the prevention and investigation of human trafficking crimes and provide legal assistance to victims.

Awards
On March 8, 2007, the U.S. Department of State honored Susana Trimarco with the International Women of Courage Award, conferred by Secretary of State Condoleezza Rice. The official citation reads:
Ms. Susana Trimarco de Veron has faced danger and threats in her efforts to combat human trafficking and to find her daughter, who was kidnapped by traffickers. Desperate to find her missing daughter, Ms. Trimarco put herself in dangerous situations, disguised as a prostitute, trolling bars and alleys in search of anyone who might know her daughter's whereabouts. Despite false leads and death threats, she has uncovered evidence of trafficking networks operating in the Argentine provinces of La Rioja, Tucuman, Buenos Aires, Cordoba, and Santa Cruz. Thanks to Ms. Trimarco's work, human trafficking is now gaining public and government attention in Argentina, and victims are being encouraged to report the crime.

The Argentinian national senate also honored Susana Trimarco with the Premio Domingo Faustino Sarmiento for her work in promotion of human rights.

On March 14, 2012, the Canadian government honored Ms. Trimarco with the John Diefenbaker Defender of Human Rights and Freedom Award.

Trimarco was nominated for the 2013 Nobel Peace Prize.

Media 
The Telefé series Vidas Robadas ("Stolen Lives") was inspired by this case.

Susana Trimarco was also the subject of a 2009 documentary, Fragmentos de una Búsqueda (Fragments of a Search), directed by Pablo Milstein and Norberto Ludín.

A season 16 episode of Law & Order: Special Victims Unit, "Undercover Mother," was inspired by Susana's story.

See also 
Human rights in Argentina
Human trafficking in Argentina

References

External links
"Proponen a Trimarco para el Nobel de la Paz", Perfil, 26 abril, 2012 [Nobel Peace Prize proposal.]

1954 births
Argentine human rights activists
Women human rights activists
Human trafficking in Argentina
Living people
People from Tucumán Province
Place of birth missing (living people)
Recipients of the International Women of Courage Award